Sandy Szwarc (born in 1956) is a food writer and marketing consultant with a Bachelor of Science in Nursing who has written articles about food for many publications, including The Washington Post, The Los Angeles Times, and Christian Science Monitor. She is the author of the book Real New Mexico Chile: An Insider's Guide to Cooking With Chile and is a contributing author to such cookbooks as The Bon Appetit Cookbook.

Published articles
Szwarc's writing criticizes what she takes to be the faulty science and exaggerated fears of the environmental and natural food movements.  Szwarc has written for the Competitive Enterprise Institute's magazine, CEI's Monthly Planet, TCS Daily and other online and print journals.  Some of her articles are “To Panic or Not to Panic? Farmed Salmon: Anatomy of a False Scare,”  "Fever Pitch on Mercury Fears"; "The fear factor: benefits of safe, healthful fish lost in sea of methylmercury concerns"; "Using the Most Vulnerable" (regarding phthalates) and "Fear for Profit" (biotechnology controversy)

Junkfood science 
According to Szwarc, her blog is about "critical examinations of studies and news on food, weight, health, and healthcare that mainstream media misses."

Notes

External links 
 Junkfood Science Sandy Szwarc's blog
 Sandy Scwarc's articles for TCS Daily
 Profile on sourceWatch

Living people
1956 births
American bloggers